Ádám Halás (born 2 August 1998) is a Slovak swimmer. He competed in the men's 50 metre butterfly event at the 2018 FINA World Swimming Championships (25 m), in Hangzhou, China.

References

1998 births
Living people
Slovak male swimmers
Male butterfly swimmers
Place of birth missing (living people)
Competitors at the 2019 Summer Universiade